Godwin Olorunfemi Ebenmosi Abadaki (born 12 October 1993) is a footballer who plays as a forward for Stalybridge Celtic. He played in the Football League for Rochdale and was also loaned to Hyde during the 2011–12 season as they were crowned Conference North Champions.

Career

Rochdale
Abadaki came through Rochdale's youth system. He made his Football League debut against Tranmere Rovers on 17 January 2012 as a late substitute. He also came on as a substitute in Rochdale's following game against Wycombe.

Loans
He signed for Football League Championship side Huddersfield Town on 19 September 2012 on a youth loan until January 2013. As part of the deal Abadaki worked with Senior Professional Development Coach Steve Eyre and the Under-21 Development Squad during his stay at the club, with the option of a permanent deal at the conclusion of the youth loan.

Abadaki joined Hyde United on a month's loan with fellow Rochdale striker Reece Gray in February 2012. His loan was extended and at the end of his time with the club he had scored two goals in ten league appearances.

Further loan periods followed with Southport in 2013, and Stalybridge Celtic in early 2014. On 24 March 2014, Abadaki joined Workington on loan.

Northwich Victoria
In summer of 2014 he joined Northwich Victoria. He made his competitive debut for the club in a draw against Kendal Town on 16 August. His first competitive goal for the club came on 25 August, as they beat Warrington Town 2–0. He then hit his first hat-tick for the club as they beat AFC Emley 4–0 in an FA Cup preliminary round match. He continued his goal-scoring record as he then scored twice for the club on 9 September as they beat Burscough 5–0.

Ashton United
His next move was to Ashton United.

Mossley
He then joined Mossley.

Nantwich Town
After spending some time on trial with Stockport County and then with Nantwich Town, in August 2016 he joined Nantwich Town.

Shaw Lane
In March 2017 he joined Shaw Lane.

Second time at Mossley
He then re-joined Mossley.

Buxton
In July 2020 he joined Buxton.

Ramsbottom United
In August 2021 he signed for Ramsbottom United.

Stalybridge Celtic
In June 2022, Abadaki returned to Stalybridge Celtic having previously spent time with the club on loan.

Personal life
His older brother, Osebi (born 1991), is also a footballer who started his career at Blackburn Rovers' academy before playing extensively in English non-league football in the north of England.  In 2017, both brothers played at the same time for the same club, Shaw Lane and in 2020 were both at Buxton at the same time.

References

External links

Official Profile at the official Rochdale site

1993 births
Living people
Association football forwards
Rochdale A.F.C. players
Hyde United F.C. players
Huddersfield Town A.F.C. players
Workington A.F.C. players
English Football League players
Stalybridge Celtic F.C. players
Southport F.C. players
Northwich Victoria F.C. players
Ashton United F.C. players
Mossley A.F.C. players
Nantwich Town F.C. players
Shaw Lane A.F.C. players
Buxton F.C. players
Ramsbottom United F.C. players
English footballers
Nigerian expatriate footballers
Nigerian expatriate sportspeople in England
Sportspeople from Kwara State